The 2017 Liga 3 Maluku is the third edition of Liga 3 Maluku as a qualifying round for the 2017 Liga 3. 

The competition scheduled starts on 22 July 2017.

Teams
There are 7 clubs which will participate the league in this season.

References 

2017 in Indonesian football